Borden Flats Light is a historic lighthouse on the Taunton River in Fall River, Massachusetts, US. It is a tower-on-caisson type known as a sparkplug lighthouse.

The light was built in 1881, and added to the National Register of Historic Places as Borden Flats Light Station on June 15, 1987, reference number 87001528.

History
By the mid-19th century, the city of Fall River had become a bustling textile-mill town, with regularly scheduled steamboat service to Providence, Rhode Island, and New York City. The city is located at the mouth of the Taunton River where it meets Mount Hope Bay, which is an arm of Narragansett Bay.

Prior to the lighthouse, an unlit day beacon was constructed to mark the spot of a dangerous reef near the center of the relatively shallow Mount Hope Bay. In June 1880, $25,000 was appropriated for the construction of a new lighthouse on Borden Flats, which consisted of a  cast-iron tower that included a keeper's quarters. Rainwater was collected in gutters and stored in a cistern in the structure's basement level, providing the keeper's water supply.

The lighthouse, which sits in water open to the south, was battered in the hurricane of 1938. The storm left the structure with a pronounced tilt, which it still has. A new wider caisson was later added around the original one for additional protection.

In 1957, the lighthouse was electrified. It was automated in 1963. In 1977, its Fresnel lens was removed and replaced with a modern Vega VRB-25 lens. The fog bell remained in use until 1983 when it was replaced by an electronic foghorn. Under auspices of the National Historic Lighthouse Preservation Act of 2000, the lighthouse was auctioned privately through the General Services Administration. Nick Korstad, Cindy Korstad and Craig Korstad, of Portland, Oregon purchased the Light at auction and Nick, quickly began his 7-year passion and dedication to restoring this historic gem.  After a successful rehab, Nick sold the Light to local resident Kevin M. Ferias in 2018, who is continuing the Overnight Keepers Program established in 2015.  The Light is privately owned and maintained and is offered to the public for overnight stays, where you can experience living the life of a 19th century Light Keeper, but in a modern and comfortable way.  The Light has 5 levels, is adorned with antiques and lighthouse memorabilia, with a 1st level kitchen, 2nd level living room, TV room/den on 3rd level, 4th level queen-sized bedroom and its 5th level lantern room with an incredible view of Mount Hope Bay, Braga Bridge and the city of Fall River.  Guests come from all over the world to enjoy the experience as it is one of only two offshore caisson Light towers you can spend the night in throughout America.   con

See also
National Register of Historic Places listings in Fall River, Massachusetts

References

External links

Lighthouses completed in 1881
Lighthouses on the National Register of Historic Places in Massachusetts
Buildings and structures in Fall River, Massachusetts
Lighthouses in Bristol County, Massachusetts
National Register of Historic Places in Fall River, Massachusetts
1881 establishments in Massachusetts